Haukadalur (Icelandic: , from  , "hawk dale" or "valley of hawks") is a valley in Iceland. It lies to the north of Laugarvatn lake in the south of Iceland.

Geysers
Haukadalur is home to some of the best known sights in Iceland: the geysers and other geothermal features which have developed on the Laugarfjall  rhyolitic dome. The biggest geysers of Haukadalur are Strokkur and Geysir itself, which gave us the word 'geyser'. Strokkur is very dependable and erupts every 5 to 10 minutes, whereas the bigger Geysir nowadays erupts very rarely. There are also more than 40 other smaller hot springs, mud pots and fumaroles nearby.

Haukadalur geothermal area was first mentioned in written sources around 1294, when the local hot springs were activated by an earthquake. Earthquakes are also known to have activated local geysers in the recent past, including the earthquakes that occurred on 17 and 21 July 2000. Due to the geysers the valley has been a popular tourist attraction since the 18th century.

Nearby attractions
The Gullfoss waterfall is about 10 km to the north in the direction of the Highlands of Iceland, via the beginning of the Kjölur highland road. Along with Gullfoss and Þingvellir, Haukadalur is part of the Golden Circle.

Gallery

See also
List of cities and towns in Iceland
List of earthquakes in Iceland
List of waterfalls of Iceland
Volcanism of Iceland

References

Forests of Iceland
Valleys of Iceland
Southern Region (Iceland)